Domingo Kamonga (born 3 March 1974 in Tondoro, Okavango Region) is a Namibian rugby Lock with United Rugby Club and the Namibia national rugby union team. He made his international debut with Namibia in 2004.

References

1974 births
Living people
Namibian rugby union players
Rugby union locks
People from Kavango Region
Namibia international rugby union players